This is a list of rivers of Finland. Listing begins with rivers flowing into the Baltic sea, from the north, that is from the Swedish border. Tributaries are listed down the page in an upstream direction.

Water flows from Finland directly to the Baltic Sea, which is divided here into the Gulf of Bothnia and Gulf of Finland, and the Archipelago Sea between them. Some rivers flow to Russia, ending either to Gulf of Finland or to the White Sea, and a few to the Arctic Ocean through Russia or Norway.

There are many lakes in Finland and so this listing includes also several lakes through which the rivers flow or begin from. Due to the great number of lakes especially in the Finnish Lakeland, where watercourses tend to consist of chains of lakes rather than long rivers, some rivers with a large catchment area can also be quite short or there may only be a short rapid between large lakes, like for example Tammerkoski in Tampere.

Rivers flowing to the Gulf of Bothnia

Torne River (in Tornio and Haparanda) - border with Sweden
Tengeliönjoki (in Aavasaksa) 
Muonionjoki (near Pajala) - border with Sweden
Könkämäeno (near Kaaresuvanto) - border with Sweden
Lätäseno (near Kaaresuvanto)
Kemijoki (in Kemi) 
Ounasjoki (in Rovaniemi)
Näkkäläjoki (near Hetta)
Käkkälöjoki (near Hetta)
Raudanjoki (near Oikarainen)
flows through lake Kemijärvi
Kitinen (near Pelkosenniemi)
Luiro (near Pelkosenniemi)
Jeesiöjoki (in Sodankylä)
Tenniöjoki (near Savukoski) – flows from Russia
Kuolajoki (in Salla) – flows from Russia
Värriöjoki (in Martti)
Simojoki (in Simo)
Iijoki (in Ii)
Siuruanjoki (in Yli-Ii)
Livojoki (near Pudasjärvi)
Kiiminkijoki (in Haukipudas)
Oulu River (in Oulu) 
lake Oulujärvi
Kiehimänjoki (in Paltamo)
Kajaaninjoki (near Kajaani)
Pyhäjoki River (in Pyhäjoki)
Kalajoki River (in Kalajoki)
Lestijoki (in Himanka)
Perhonjoki (in Kokkola)
Lapuanjoki (in Nykarleby)
Esse å (near Jakobstad)
Kyrönjoki (near Vaasa) 
Närpes å (near Närpes)
Karvianjoki (in Merikarvia and at two different points in Ahlainen, Pori, due to river bifurcation)
Kokemäenjoki (in Pori)
Loimijoki (in Huittinen)
lakes Rautavesi and Kulovesi
Nokianvirta (in Nokia)
Lake Pyhäjärvi (south of Tampere)
Tammerkoski (in Tampere)
Lake Näsijärvi (north of Tampere)
Kuokkalankoski rapids (in Lempäälä)
Lake Vanajavesi (between Lempäälä, Valkeakoski and Hämeenlinna)
Valkeakoski rapids (in Valkeakoski)
Lake Mallasvesi (north of Valkeakoski)
Eurajoki (in Eurajoki)
Lapinjoki (in Eurajoki)

Rivers flowing to the Archipelago Sea
Laajoki (in Mynämäki)
Mynäjoki (in Mynämäki)
Aurajoki (in Turku)
Paimionjoki (in Paimio)
Halikonjoki (in Halikko, Salo)
Uskelanjoki (in Salo)
Perniönjoki (in Perniö, Salo)
Kiskonjoki (in Kisko, Salo)

Rivers flowing to the Gulf of Finland
Svartån (in Karis, Raseborg)
Vantaa River (in Helsinki)
Keravanjoki (in Vantaa)
Porvoonjoki (in Porvoo)
Kymijoki (in Kotka and near Ruotsinpyhtää)
from Lake Päijänne
Jämsänjoki (in Jämsä)

Rivers flowing to Russia, to the Gulf of Finland
Water from these rivers flows through Lake Ladoga and Neva River to the sea.

River Vuoksi (in Imatra)
lake Saimaa
To the interconnected lakes on the same level as Saimaa (for example Lake Pyhäselkä near Joensuu):
Höytiäisenkanava (in Joensuu) from lake Höytiäinen
Pielisjoki (in Joensuu) from lake Pielinen
Koitajoki (near Eno) from lake Koitere, flows partly in Russia
from lake Pielinen
Lieksanjoki, in Lieksa) from Lake Leksozero in Russia, through a chain of lakes
Tuulijoki from Lake Tulos in Russia
Jänisjoki (in Värtsilä)
Tohmajoki (in Tohmajärvi
Kiteenjoki, in Kitee
Hiitolanjoki, in Rautjärvi

Rivers flowing to Russia, to the White Sea
Pistojoki (south-east of Kuusamo) - flows to the Kem River in Russia
 Lakes Muojärvi and Kuusamojärvi in Kuusamo
Oulankajoki (north-east of Kuusamo) - flows to the Kovda River in Russia
Kitkanjoki (near the Russian border) - flows to Oulankajoki in Finland near the Russian border
Kuusinkijoki (near the Russian border - flows to Oulankajoki in Russia near the Finnish border
Tuntsajoki River (in Salla) - flows to the Kovda River in Russia

Rivers flowing to Russia or Norway, to the Arctic Ocean
Luttojoki - flows to the Tuloma River in Russia
Paatsjoki - border between Norway and Russia
Lake Inari
Ivalojoki (near Ivalo)
Juutuanjoki (in the village of Inari)
Lake Paatari
Lemmenjoki 
Vaskojoki
Näätämöjoki - flows to Norway
Tana - flows to Norway, border between Finland and Norway
Utsjoki (in Utsjoki)
Inarijoki near Karigasniemi) - border between Finland and Norway

By length
This is a list of the rivers, exceeding 100 km, that are wholly or partly located within the borders of Finland.

See also
 :Category:Drainage basins of the Baltic Sea
 :Category:Drainage basins of the Barents Sea

Further reading

External links

 Table of main watersheds in Finland, Finland’s environmental administration 29.12.2009 
 Map of main watersheds in Finland, Finland’s environmental administration 29.12.2009 

 List of rivers of Finland
Finland
Rivers